Hadjina is a genus of moths of the family Noctuidae. The genus was described by Staudinger in 1891.

Species
 Hadjina atrinota Hampson, 1909
 Hadjina attinis Draudt, 1950
 Hadjina beata (Staudinger, 1895)
 Hadjina biguttula Motschulsky
 Hadjina carcaroda (Distant, 1901)
 Hadjina cinerea Hampson, 1909
 Hadjina cupreipennis (Moore, 1882)
 Hadjina eremita A. Bang-Haas, 1912
 Hadjina ferruginea Hampson, 1909
 Hadjina grisea (Hampson, 1891)
 Hadjina lutosa Staudinger, 1891
 Hadjina modestissima (Snellen, 1877)
 Hadjina obscura Hampson, 1918
 Hadjina palaestinensis (Staudinger, 1895)
 Hadjina pallida (Leech, 1900)
 Hadjina plumbeogrisea (Hampson, 1916)
 Hadjina poliastis (Hampson, 1907)
 Hadjina pyroxantha (Hampson, 1902)
 Hadjina radiata (Leech, 1900)
 Hadjina tyriobaphes Wiltshire, 1983
 Hadjina wichti (Hirschke, 1903)

References

Condicinae